is a Japanese composer, arranger and producer. He composes soundtracks for television and commercials.

Discography

Movie

Television Drama

Anime

References

External links 
 
 

1967 births
Anime composers
Japanese composers
Japanese film score composers
Japanese male film score composers
Japanese male composers
Japanese male musicians
Japanese music arrangers
Living people